Barry Stuart McDonald (9 June 1940 – 1 January 2020) was a Papua New Guinea-born Australian rugby union player who represented Australia.

McDonald, a flanker, was born in Wau, Papua New Guinea, in the province of Morobe and claimed a total of 2 international rugby caps for Australia.

References

Australian rugby union players
Australia international rugby union players
1940 births
2020 deaths
Rugby union flankers